The Guotai Liquor Asian Players Tour Championship 2012/2013 – Event 1 was a professional minor-ranking snooker tournament that took place between 18 and 22 June 2012 at the Zhangjiagang Sports Center in Zhangjiagang, China.

Stuart Bingham won his sixth professional title by defeating Stephen Lee 4–3 in the final. This win has also guaranteed Bingham a place in this season's PTC Finals.

Prize fund and ranking points
The breakdown of prize money and ranking points of the event is shown below:

1 Only professional players can earn ranking points.

Main draw

Wildcard round
Best of 7 frames

Main rounds

Top half

Section 1

Section 2

Bottom half

Section 3

Section 4

Finals

Century breaks
 
 127  Cai Jianzhong
 119  Mark Williams
 117, 112, 104  Stuart Bingham
 116  Dominic Dale
 114  Tom Ford
 112, 100  Stephen Lee
 109, 105, 100  Michael White
 107  Robert Milkins
 102  Chen Zhe
 102  Ding Junhui

References

External links
 Guotai Liqueur Asian PTC1 – Pictures by World Snooker at Facebook

Asian 1
2012 in Chinese sport
Snooker competitions in China